The Artful Dodge is an American literary magazine based in Wooster, Ohio, at the College of Wooster.  Founded by Daniel Bourne in 1979 in Bloomington, Indiana, the magazine has progressed from a flimsy pamphlet of carbon copies to a professionally produced literary magazine that won Bourne the Ohioana Library Association's Award for Editorial Excellence in 1992.

Receiving grants from Ohio Arts Council and relying on student editors to sift through the over 3,000 manuscripts received each year, the Artful Dodge has managed to continue production to the present day, and has published writers such as Czesław Miłosz, William S. Burroughs, Giannina Braschi, Charles Simic, Naomi Shihab Nye, and Ronald Wallace, and interviews with Jorge Luis Borges, Czesław Miłosz, W. S. Merwin, Nathalie Sarraute, Gwendolyn Brooks, William Least Heat-Moon, Michael Dorris, Tim O'Brien, and Stuart Dybek.

References

External links
Official web site
Wordpress

Literary magazines published in the United States
Annual magazines published in the United States
Magazines established in 1979
Magazines published in Ohio
Magazines published in Indiana